Estadio Juan N. López is a football stadium located in La Piedad, Michoacán, Mexico. It is home to Segunda División de México (Mexico Second Division) club La Piedad. It opened in 1994 and has a setting capacity of 13,356.

References

External links
 La Piedad site

J
Sports venues in Michoacán